Ilatovskaya is a rural locality (a village) in Lomovatskoye Rural Settlement, Velikoustyugsky District, Vologda Oblast, Russia. The population was 55 as of 2002.

Geography 
Ilatovskaya is located 89 km northwest of Veliky Ustyug (the district's administrative centre) by road. Pikhtovo is the nearest rural locality.

References 

Rural localities in Velikoustyugsky District